Maria Malicka (9 May 1898 – 30 September 1992) was a Polish stage and film actress. She appeared in ten films between 1927 and 1966.

Selected filmography
 Dzikuska (1928)
 Uwiedziona (1931)
 Pan Twardowski (1936)
 Bariera (1966)

References

External links

1898 births
1992 deaths
20th-century Polish actresses
Actresses from Kraków
Polish film actresses
Polish stage actresses
Polish silent film actresses